Sultanahmet (named after Sultan Ahmed) may refer to these places in Istanbul:

 Sultanahmet is a neighbourhood in the district of Fatih
 Sultan Ahmed Mosque (Sultanahmet Mosque)
 Sultanahmet Square (Hippodrome of Constantinople)
 Sultanahmet Jail, now a hotel

See also 
 Sultan Ahmed Mosque (disambiguation): other namesake mosques, mostly in Europe